Alaiedon Township is a civil township of Ingham County in the U.S. state of Michigan.  As of the 2020 census, the township population was 2,910.

Communities
German was an area of the township originally settled by immigrants from Germany.
The city of Lansing is to the northwest of the township and also controls a noncontiguous tract of land within the township along Interstate 96 under a conditional land transfer agreement. Much of the northern portion is considered to be part of the Greater Lansing urban area.
The city of Mason is to the south and has annexed land that was formerly within the township.
The unincorporated community of Holt in Delhi Charter Township is to the west and the unincorporated community of Okemos in Meridian Charter Township is to the north.
Michigan State University owns land in the northwest corner of the township.

History
The land that was to become the township was surveyed by a Musgrove Evans in 1827. James Phillips became the first person to settle in the township in December 1836 at a location known as Alaiedon Center. It was also known as German Settlement because most of its early residents were Germans. In 1837 the first settlement, Jefferson City, was platted and founded at what is today the Hagadorn and Lamb intersection along Mud Creek. The township was formally organized in 1842, and was named by Henry Schoolcraft, who came up with a pseudo-Native American name he claimed meant "hill land for excellent living." At the time of its organization, the township consisted of what is today Lansing, Meridian, Delhi and Alaiedon townships. The aforementioned townships would be spun off in 1842 to give the township the boundaries it has to this day.

The township's settlement pattern changed considerably in 1847, the same year the state capital was moved to Lansing Township. It was found that the town was never formally platted, and thus did not legally exist, preventing the settlement's residents from obtaining deeds to their properties. Subsequently, the town was abandoned and few traces remain of its existence today. In 1877, residents constructed a township hall on one-quarter of an acre of Ingham County's "poor farm" that served as the township hall until 1959 when a new one was constructed at 2021 West Holt Road.

In 1998, 2008, and 2013, the township entered into PA 425 Agreements, which conditionally transferred hundreds of acres of territory in the north-central part of the township to the city of Lansing to retain and expand the headquarters of Jackson National Life Insurance.

Geography

Sycamore Creek flows northward through the western part of the township.  The eastern boundary of the township is the Michigan meridian used in the survey of Michigan.

Demographics
As of the census of 2000, there were 3,498 people, 1,115 households, and 877 families residing in the township. The racial makeup of the township was 89.82% White, 6.15% African American, 0.63% Native American, 1.40% Asian, 0.06% Pacific Islander, 0.86% from other races, and 1.09% from two or more races. Hispanic or Latino of any race were 2.37% of the population.

There were 1,115 households, out of which 32.8% had children under the age of 18 living with them, 71.3% were married couples living together, 4.7% had a female householder with no husband present, and 21.3% were non-families. 17.2% of all households were made up of individuals, and 6.5% had someone living alone who was 65 years of age or older.  The average household size was 2.71 and the average family size was 3.05.

In the township, the population was spread out, with 21.7% under the age of 18, 9.9% from 18 to 24, 28.9% from 25 to 44, 28.5% from 45 to 64, and 11.0% who were 65 years of age or older.  The median age was 39 years. For every 100 females, there were 123.7 males.  For every 100 females age 18 and over, there were 130.4 males.

The median income for a household in the township was $64,680, and the median income for a family was $69,261. Males had a median income of $52,500 versus $35,028 for females. The per capita income for the township was $24,048.  About 1.9% of families and 5.2% of the population were below the poverty line, including 5.2% of those under age 18 and 7.4% of those aged 65 or over.

The 2000 Census was erroneously found to have included population in the nearby city of Mason within the boundaries of the township.  Mason launched a successful census challenge putting the revised population of the township at 3,048 for the 2000 Census.

References

Sources

External links
Official website

Townships in Michigan
Townships in Ingham County, Michigan
Lansing–East Lansing metropolitan area
1838 establishments in Michigan
Populated places established in 1838